Mike Smithson may refer to:
Mike Smithson (British journalist) (born 1946), British journalist, Liberal Democrat politician, and political betting expert
Mike Smithson (Australian journalist), Australian news reporter
Mike Smithson (baseball) (born 1955), American baseball player
Mike Smithson (make-up artist), American make-up artist